Lokmanya Tilak Terminus–Hazur Sahib Nanded Express was an intercity train of the Indian Railways connecting Lokmanya Tilak Terminus Kurla in Maharashtra and  of Maharashtra. It was being operated with 11011/11012 train numbers on a weekly basis. This now discontinued by South Central Railways.

Service

The 11011/Mumbai LTT–Hazur Sahib Nanded (Weekly) Express has an average speed of 44 km/hr and covers 728 km in 16 hrs 40 mins. 11012/Hazur Sahib Nanded–Mumbai LTT Weekly Express has an average speed of 44 km/hr and covers 728 km in 17 hrs 15 mins.
Max permissible speed is 110kmph from PUNE TO KWD. without halting (through) DAUND JN.

Route and halts

Coach composition

The train consists of 22 LHB-type coaches:

 1 AC II Tier
 4 AC III Tier
 12 Sleeper coaches
 3 General
 2 luggage cum generator car (EOG)

Traction

Both trains are hauled by a Kalyan Loco Shed-based WDP-4D or WDM-3D or WDM-3A  diesel locomotive from Kurla to Nanded.

Direction reversal

The train reverses its direction 2 times:

Notes 
 Wednesday

External links 
 Updated Time Table of 11011 Lokmanyatilak Nanded Express
 Updated Time Table of 11012 Nanded Lokmanyatilak Express
 11011/Mumbai LTT - Hazur Sahib Nanded (Weekly) Express
 Hazur Sahib Nanded - Mumbai LTT Weekly Express

References 

Express trains in India
Rail transport in Maharashtra
Transport in Mumbai
Transport in Nanded
Railway services introduced in 2014